Varbitsa is a river in the Eastern Rhodope mountains in Bulgaria.
The Varbitsa river, a tributary to the Arda, the main river of the Rhodope Mountains, runs through 8 municipalities, 6 of them within the region of Kardzhali and 2 in the region of Smolyan. It is the lifeline of the area, with industrial, drinking and irrigation water coming out, and refuse, raw sewage and industrial waste going in. That the Varbitsa starts below an officially “safe” tailings reservoir above the town of Zlatograd has been of concern, as has the fact that Zlatograd's rubbish dump is next to the river, and begins to enter into its waters as it expands. The Varbitsa is Bulgaria's most temperamental river, with up to 5,000 times difference in water volume between spring highs and autumn lows, with frequent massive flooding and erosion as a result.

References

Rivers of Bulgaria
Landforms of Smolyan Province